VG Cats (short for Video Game Cats) is a webcomic written and drawn by Canadian cartoonist Scott Ramsoomair. Published on its own website, it featured the adventures of a pair of anthropomorphic cats, who often played the roles of characters in popular video games that are parodied in the strip. Strips were usually presented in a large format and in full color. The author generally set Mondays as days for updating the comic; however, the update schedule had a reputation of being incredibly sporadic; he frequently mocked his tardiness in updating in various strips due to personal reasons, drawing nude drawings on Patreon and frequent convention appearances. As of March 2018, the site had approximately 380 comics listed in its main archives. Based on this archive alone, VG Cats averaged 25 comics a year while it was at its peak. During 2017-2018 that average has gone down to 5 comics a year.
Ramsoomair updated the comic on May 22, 2020, adding a completely different website. Later changes included comic #381, which was planned to be released in February 2020, and the removal of ads, because he felt internet advertising had become "information peddling", stating that he "[doesn't] think [he's] okay with what they are anymore". The comic is now very irregularly updated, with only 4 comics being posted since 2018, the most recent update being comic #384 on February 22, 2021.

The VG Cats website also hosted Adventure Log, a Final Fantasy XI webcomic written and drawn by Ramsoomair, and Super Effective, a webcomic parody of the Pokémon game series. Adventure Log has not been updated since 2008 and "Super Effective" has not been updated since 2014.

The comic series often includes video game-based humor and satire targeting the video game industry.

History
Ramsoomair said that he began the strip due to boredom at work; he created comics during his lunch breaks. The first VG Cats strip was released on September 1, 2001. (His answer on the FAQ page said it was bad timing, probably in reference to the September 11 attacks that happened that same month)<ref name="faq">FAQ. VG Cats</ref> Prior to taking the VGCats.com domain, the comic was hosted at www.vgcats.cjb.net. For a period, VG Cats was affiliated with BuzzComix. During April 1 (April Fools' Day), Ramsoomair replaces the regular home page with fake pages, like a "Krug" page in 2003"Main.htm", VG Cats or a Myspace profile for Solid Snake in 2007.

In 2006, Ramsoomair made a strip depicting creatures from Maxis' videogame Spore, and Maxis created a version of the strip replacing all the drawn characters with in-game versions, and sent him custom figurines of the creatures.

In February 2022, Ramsoomair announced the end of the webcomic in a now deleted post on Patreon.

Development
Ramsoomair said that VGCats was "basically ... along the lines of Penny Arcade." The comic originally focused on 2 gamers; Ramsoomair said by 2006 that within the preceding one to two years he began focusing upon parodies of video games instead of the two gamer format.

CharactersVG Cats was not a plot driven comic, though there were several characters that were staples of the comic. Ramsoomair said that all of his characters "relate" to him "at some point."

Joystiq has defined them as "adorable characters who feel most at home with violence, language, and sexual innuendo". Recurring characters in VG Cats include:

Aeris
Aeris was blue-eyed female cat with pink fur. She had a hot temper and lashed out at Leo frequently. Aeris was introduced on September 4, 2001 in Strip 2, "Pika?".

Leo Leonardo, The Third
Leo Leonardo, The Third was a green-eyed male cat with grey fur. Leo was named after one of Ramsoomair's real cats; Ramsoomair describes the association as "in name only." Ramsoomair euthanized the real-life cat Leo on July 19, 2010. Leo was introduced on September 4, 2001 in Strip 1, "Feelin' Gassy".

Pantsman
The alter ego of Scott Ramsoomair, Pantsman is an incompetent superhero who concealed his identity by wearing trousers and sometimes underpants on his head. His greatest weakness is vodka cooler, which causes him to drop his trousers and transform into "Peter Pantsless". He also wore a pair of jeans around his neck, to provide a two tailed cape. He was introduced in Strip 37, "I Like Bunnies", to help explain the inconsistent updating of the comic.

Animated series

Chris Boe, a friend and associate of Ramsoomair, created an animated adaptation of VG Cats."VGCats.htm", Chris Boe Only the first half of the first episode, "Episode 1: A Tale of Two Kitties", has been produced, and was released on January 21, 2006. Boe wrote and animated the episode.

Related comicsBad Mushrooms, a sprite comic created by Ramsoomair prior to the creation of VG Cats, is hosted on VGCats.com.Adventure Log, the official Final Fantasy XI webcomic written and drawn by Ramsoomair. It has not been updated since 2008.Super Effective, also done by Ramsoomair, began in April 2008 as a comic parody of the popular game series Pokémon. It is also hosted on the VGCats website. It has not been updated since 2014.

VG Lewds
After comic #380 in 2018, Scott created a Patreon account for furry-themed pornography based around Leo and Aeris among other video game related characters titled VG Lewds. On the same day as the aforementioned comic, Scott stated in a blog post that the site's advertising revenue was no longer able to sustain him financially, and asked his users to help "support me in this newest venture". Ramsoomairt later disabled adverts on the VG Cats website altogether in 2020, citing ethical reasons. 

As of March 2022, the VG Lewds Patreon was shut down without comment, with later Ramsoomair stating he wanted to focus on a ending for the strip.

Merchandise
In 2003, Ramsoomair designated CafePress as the provider of the VG Cats store; Ramsoomair soon ended the relationship with CafePress. On June 16, 2004 Ramsoomair announced that he established his store on Hyperion Press."VG Cats Items", Hyperion Press Afterwards ZeStuff hosted the VG Cats Store. As of 2008 Shark Robot hosts the VGCats store. As of 2008, Ramsoomair is no longer affiliated with CafePress, but it still sells VG Cats merchandise on its website.

AwardsVG Cats'' has been nominated for several Web Cartoonist's Choice Awards, winning 2 awards in 2005 and 1 in 2006.

 2003: 
Honorable mention: 
 2006: , Winner: 
 2007:  (finalist),  (finalist),  (finalist).
 2008  (finalist)

References

External links

 VG Cats web site

2000s webcomics
Internet properties established in 2001
Canadian webcomics
Dayfree Press
Parody webcomics
Short form webcomics
Video game webcomics
Webcomics in print
Web Cartoonists' Choice Award winners
Fictional cats
2001 webcomic debuts
Canadian comedy websites
Furry fandom